USS Julius A. Furer (FFG-6) was a  in the United States Navy.

Julius A. Furer was launched 22 July 1966 by the Bath Iron Works, Bath, Maine; and sponsored by Mrs. Julius A. Furer, widow of Rear Admiral Julius A. Furer. She was commissioned on 11 November 1967 at the Boston Naval Shipyard.

Pakistan service

Julius A. Furer was decommissioned on 31 January 1989, and leased to Pakistan as PNS Badr and returned in 1993. She was struck from the Naval Vessel Register on 2 February 1994, and disposed of by Navy title transfer to the United States Maritime Administration, 28 March 1994.

Ship awards
Navy Meritorious Unit Commendation
Navy Expeditionary Medal (2)
National Defense Service Medal
Navy Sea Service Deployment Ribbon
Coast Guard Special Operations Service Ribbon

References

 

Brooke-class frigates
Cold War frigates and destroyer escorts of the United States
Ships built in Bath, Maine
1966 ships